Takaaki Kono (4 January 1940 – 22 April 2010) was a Japanese professional golfer.

Early life 
Kono was born in Kanagawa Prefecture, Japan in 1940. He started playing golf at the age of 15.

Professional career 
Kono had much success on the Japanese and Asian circuits at the beginning of his career, winning several times. One of his top successes was at the 1969 Malaysian Open. Six shots behind at the beginning of the final round, Kono fired a 66 (−6) to capture the title by one shot over New Zealand's John Lister and Australia's David Graham.

This performance helped him earn his first special foreign invitation to the Masters Tournament that April. At Augusta, he shot a third round 68 (−4) put him in the top ten and a slight chance for the title. However he stumbled home on the final day and did not seriously contend for the championship, won by George Archer. This would be the beginning of a relatively long relationship with the event, however, as Kono would be invited to play in the tournament several more times. The following year, Kono played just as well, again shooting another 68 (this time in the second round) to place in the top ten once again where he remained after the third round. A final round 74 assured that he did not seriously contend on Sunday but he would pick up his best performance in a major championship. Kono would play in the event several more times in the early 1970s.

Kono continued to have success on the Japanese and Asian circuits, winning multiple events. He won the First Flight Tournament during the first official season of the Japan Golf Tour, but would not win again on the tour until a decade later at the Kanagawa Open.

Professional wins (17)

Japan Golf Tour wins (2)
1973 First Flight Tournament
1983 Kanagawa Open

Asia Golf Circuit (3)
1969 Malaysian Open
1971 Malaysian Open
1972 Singapore Open

Other wins (12)
This list may be incomplete
1967 Nippon Series
1968 Japan Open, Nippon Series, Brazil Open
1969 Dunlop Tournament
1970  Champions Tournament, Grand Monarch, Rolex Tournament
1971 Champions Tournament, Grand Monarch
1972 Champions Tournament
1973 Champions Tournament

Results in major championships

CUT = missed the half-way cut
"T" = tied
Note: Kono only played in the Masters Tournament.

Team appearances
World Cup (representing Japan): 1968, 1969, 1970, 1971, 1972

References

External links

Japanese male golfers
Japan Golf Tour golfers
Sportspeople from Kanagawa Prefecture
1940 births
2010 deaths